Banque Raiffeisen  is a Luxembourgish  banking and financial services company. Founded in 1926, it is one of the oldest banks in Luxembourg. The bank is independent from foreign shareholders. It is a member  of the International Raiffeisen Union (IRU), which is an association of cooperatives based on the ideas of Friedrich Wilhelm Raiffeisen.

History
Since its creation in 1926, Raiffeisen Luxembourg has become the first independent cooperative bank in the Grand-Duchy, covering the entire national territory.

In 1970, The Luxembourg Raiffeisen network accounted 138 caisses across the country.

As of 2013, Banque Raiffeisen has about 50 sales points all over the country; 11 of them depending directly from the bank, the others belonging to the 13 Caisses Raiffeisen controlled by the bank.

Banque Raiffeisen has evolved from a rural union to a universal financial institution, covering retail activities but also specialising in business, private banking and wealth management.

Art Contest
In collaboration with other cooperative banks in Europe, namely Raiffeisen (Switzerland), Raiffeisen Zentralbank Austria, the Volksbanken und Raiffeisenbanken in Germany, Raiffeisen Südtirol in Italy, Crédit Mutuel in France and the OP-Pohjola Group in Finland Banque Raiffeisen organizes an annual art contest for young people between 4 and 18 years. In Luxembourg, the drawing contest is called Raiffeisen Molconcours.

Events
Banque Raiffeisen organizes an annual conference on financial markets in collaboration with Vontobel.

Charity
Banque Raiffeisen supports Luxembourgish charities including: Croix-Rouge
, Ligue HMC, Fondation Cancer, SOS Villages d’enfants du Monde, SOS Faim and the FLEK – .

See also
 List of banks in Luxembourg

Notes and references

External links
 
 www.molconcours.lu
 www.greencode.lu

Bibliography

 Rudolf Maxeiner, Raiffeisen: Der Mann, die idee und das Werk, Deutscher Genossenschafts-Verlag ed.,1988
 André Bauler, Les fruits de la Souveraineté nationale, Caisse Centrale Raiffeisen, s.c. ed., 2001

Banks of Luxembourg
Raiffeisen (Luxembourg)
Banks established in 1926
1926 establishments in Luxembourg